Denzil Price Marshall Jr. (born July 20, 1963) is the Chief United States district judge of the United States District Court for the Eastern District of Arkansas.

Early life and education 

Born in Memphis, Tennessee, Marshall earned a Bachelor of Arts degree in 1985 from Arkansas State University and a Master of Science degree in 1987 from the London School of Economics. In 1989, Marshall earned a Juris Doctor from the Harvard Law School.

Career 

From 1989 until 1991, Marshall served as a law clerk for Judge Richard S. Arnold on the United States Court of Appeals for the Eighth Circuit. From 1991 until 1995, Marshall served as an associate with Barrett & Deacon in Jonesboro, Arkansas. From 1995 until 2006, Marshall was a principal at the law firm. In 2006, Marshall became an associate judge on the Arkansas Court of Appeals. Marshall also teaches as a member of adjunct faculty at Arkansas State University.

Federal judicial service 

After Barack Obama was elected president, Marshall interviewed with Arkansas Senator Blanche Lincoln about a vacant federal district court slot on December 29, 2008. On March 12, 2009, Lincoln and Arkansas Senator Mark Pryor told Marshall that he and others would be recommended to the White House for consideration. On December 3, 2009, Obama formally nominated Marshall to the seat, to replace Judge William Roy Wilson Jr., who had taken senior status in October 2008. The United States Senate Committee on the Judiciary reported Marshall's nomination to the full Senate on February 11, 2010. The United States Senate confirmed Marshall by voice vote on May 5, 2010. He received his commission on May 6, 2010. He became Chief Judge on July 23, 2019.

References

External links

1963 births
Arkansas state court judges
Arkansas State University alumni
Harvard Law School alumni
Judges of the United States District Court for the Eastern District of Arkansas
Living people
People from Jonesboro, Arkansas
United States district court judges appointed by Barack Obama
21st-century American judges
Alumni of the London School of Economics